Not be confused with the magazine Focus on Africa or the radio programme of the same name broadcast on the BBC World Service.

Focus on Africa is a BBC news programme broadcast on BBC World News globally and on local partner channels of the BBC in African countries. The programme was presented by Komla Dumor each weekday from its inception until his sudden death aged 41 in January 2014. The programme includes news, sport and business from across Africa and around the world.

The programme was closely related to Dira ya Dunia, an African-focused programme broadcast on BBC Swahili, which noticeably used the same title sequence.

Broadcasts
Focus on Africa is aired from 17:30–18:00 GMT (18:30-19:00 BST in summer time) on weekdays on BBC World News. The programme also airs on affiliate networks across Africa who broadcast it as a prime time news programme.

Presenters

Current

Former
Komla Dumor (Main presenter, 2012–2014)

References

External links
 (BBC World News)

BBC World News shows
2012 British television series debuts
British television news shows
English-language television shows